Dennis Walter Crane (February 23, 1945 – November 30, 2003) was an American football defensive tackle in the National Football League for the Washington Redskins and the New York Giants.  He played college football at the University of Southern California and was drafted in the fourth round of the 1968 NFL Draft.

1945 births
American football defensive tackles
Washington Redskins players
New York Giants players
USC Trojans football players
People from Colton, California
2003 deaths
Southern California Sun players